John David FitzGerald, Baron FitzGerald, PC, PC (Ire) (1 May 1816 – 16 October 1889) was an Irish judge and Liberal politician.

Background
Born in Dublin, he was the son of the merchant David FitzGerald and his wife Catherine, eldest daughter of David Leahy. His sister Kate was married to Charles Robert Barry and his youngest sister Emily to Denis Caulfield Heron. FitzGerald was educated at Trinity College Dublin and was called to the bar by King's Inns in 1838. In 1870, he received an Honorary Doctorate of Laws by the University of Dublin.

Career
FitzGerald became a Queen's Counsel in 1847 and was judge of the Munster circuit. He entered the House of Commons in 1852, sitting for Ennis the next eight years. In 1855, FitzGerald was first elected a bencher, then nominated Solicitor-General for Ireland. He became Attorney-General for Ireland a year later, on which appointment he was sworn of the Privy Council of Ireland. FitzGerald held the former post until 1858 and after a break for a year, again until 1860, when he was appointed Judge on the Court of Queen's Bench (Ireland). On 23 June 1882, he was created a Lord of Appeal in Ordinary with the title Baron FitzGerald, of Kilmarnock, in the County of Dublin. Six days later, he was additionally sworn of the Privy Council of the United Kingdom.

Judgements
Foakes v Beer [1884] UKHL 1, [1881-85] All ER Rep 106, (1884) 9 App Cas 605; 54 LJQB 130; 51 LT 833; 33 WR 233 - a leading case from the House of Lords on the legal concept of consideration

Family
In 1846, he married firstly Rose, second daughter of John O'Donohue, and had by her three sons. She died in 1850 and FitzGerald remarried Hon. Jane Matilda Mary, daughter of Lieutenant-Colonel Arthur Francis Southwell and Mary Ann Agnes Dillon,c and sister of Thomas Southwell, 4th Viscount Southwell. By his second wife, he had four sons and six daughters. Conservative politician Amber Rudd is his great-great-granddaughter.

References

External links 

 

1816 births
1889 deaths
19th-century Irish people
Lawyers from Dublin (city)
Alumni of Trinity College Dublin
Attorneys-General for Ireland
Law lords 
Members of the Judicial Committee of the Privy Council
Members of the Privy Council of Ireland
Members of the Privy Council of the United Kingdom
Members of the Parliament of the United Kingdom for County Clare constituencies (1801–1922)
19th-century King's Counsel
Solicitors-General for Ireland
UK MPs 1852–1857
UK MPs 1857–1859
UK MPs 1859–1865
UK MPs who were granted peerages
Judges of the High Court of Justice in Ireland
Alumni of King's Inns
Life peers created by Queen Victoria
Politicians from Dublin (city)